Firefly is an  independent film directed by Pete Marcy and produced by Failure Boys, a small production company based in Minneapolis, Minnesota.  It was shot in Minnesota and Wisconsin with a $6,000 budget and released in June 2005.

Plot outline 
Del (Chris Marcy) woke up in his truck, hung-over and covered with dirt. Brandt (Pete Marcy) was found floating in a river. Susan (Lindsay Hinman) was rushed to the hospital, bloody and cold. Bad things happened on Halloween night. Now, a week before Christmas, Del is having nightmares, Brandt is losing confidence in his relationship, and Susan's memory of her assault is met with pity and doubt. There is also a  strange bald man, whose unexplained clairvoyance leads him to those in need. The answers will come on Christmas Eve.

Cast
 Lindsay Marcy as Susan (as Lindsay Hinman)
 Peter Marcy as Brandt
 Chris Marcy as Del
 Devon Jorlett as Arnie
 Sara Persons as Rachel
 Joe Marcy as Joe
 Adam Anderson as Scott
 Brent Augustinack as Ear Bandage
 Andy Reeves as Casey
 Will Davis as Will
 Skip Reeves as Otto Maki
 Delta Shelby as Nicki
 Josh Hodney as Barry
 David Greene as Greenbriar Resident

Film festivals 
 2005
 CineVegas Film Festival (Las Vegas, World Premiere)
 2006
 Bluegrass Film Festival (Kentucky)
 Kansas International Film Festival (Kansas City)
 Sidewalk Moving Picture Festival (Birmingham)
 Fantastic Fest (Austin)
 Shriekfest (L.A.)
 International Horror and Sci-Fi Film Festival (Phoenix)
 2007
 Amsterdam Fantastic Film Festival (Amsterdam, International Premiere)
 Minneapolis-Saint Paul International Film Festival (Minneapolis)

Awards 
 "Audience Award" (third place), Fantastic Fest
 "Best Writing", Bluegrass Film Festival
 "Best Sci-Fi Feature", International Horror and Sci-Fi Film Festival
 "Best Director", International Horror and Sci-Fi Film Festival

Origin and alternative drafts 
Firefly was co-written and directed by Pete Marcy.  Originally conceived in 2000, Firefly was written backwards, with the ending giving way to the intricate build-up preceding it; once the skeleton of the story was in place, Marcy's brother Chris joined him in writing the rest of the script, filling out dialogue and characters.  Originally, the ending was to take place in a warehouse, with a struggle over a knife and a fatal gunshot, but Pete and Chris, along with the rest of the crew, thought that was "stupid".

Firefly began filming in November 2002 and finished post-production in June 2005, running 115 minutes.  An alternative, final cut was finished in Spring 2006, running 104 minutes.  Among the scenes cut out was one with the director's mother.

Reviews
The film was reviewed in Las Vegas Weekly, Popmatters, Dread Central, and by Eric D. Snider.

References

External links 
 

American independent films
2005 films
2000s American films